Neuendorf may refer to:

Germany
Babelsberg, Potsdam in Brandenburg, used to be two villages, Babelsberg and Neuendorf, until their official unification in 1907
Neuendorf, Bavaria, in the district Main-Spessart, Bavaria
Hohen Neuendorf, in the district Oberhavel, Brandenburg
Neuendorf (Brück), a village near Brück in Brandenburg
Neuendorf A, in the district Ostvorpommern, Mecklenburg-Vorpommern
Neuendorf B, in the district Ostvorpommern, Mecklenburg-Vorpommern
Neuendorf, Rhineland-Palatinate, in the district Bitburg-Prüm, Rhineland-Palatinate
Kloster Neuendorf, in the district Altmarkkreis Salzwedel, Saxony-Anhalt
Neuendorf am Damm, in the district Altmarkkreis Salzwedel, Saxony-Anhalt
Neuendorf, Saxony-Anhalt, in the district Altmarkkreis Salzwedel, Saxony-Anhalt
Neuendorf bei Elmshorn, in the district Steinburg, Schleswig-Holstein
Neuendorf-Sachsenbande, in the district Steinburg, Schleswig-Holstein

Poland
Przęsocin, a village north of Szczecin formerly known by the German name Neuendorf
Piaseczno, Gmina Banie, a village south of Szczecin formerly known by the German name Neuendorf
Wisełka, formerly Neuendorf, a town on the island of Wolin

Russia
Rzhevskoye Microdistrict, part of Kaliningrad, formerly known by the German name Adlig Neuendorf

Switzerland
Neuendorf, Switzerland, in the canton of Solothurn

See also
 Neudorf (disambiguation)